Asit Rai (Nepali: असीत राई) is a writer and novelist in the Nepali language from Darjeeling district, India. He received the Sahitya Akademi Award in 1981 for his novel Naya Kshitij Ko Khoj.

References

Nepali-language writers from India
Recipients of the Sahitya Akademi Award in Nepali
People from Darjeeling district
Living people
Year of birth missing (living people)
Indian Gorkhas
Rai people